Berthe Andiolo (born Berthe Prudence Ongnomo Andiolo on 15 April 1992) is a Cameroonian football forward, who plays for Adana İdman Yurdu in the Wommen's Super Leadue in Turkey. She was a member of the Cameroon women's national football team.

Club career 
Andiolo played for the Belarusian FC Minsk in 2011. She was a member of Amazone FAP in 2015–2016, Canon Yaoundé in 2019, and FC Ebolowa in her country, before she signed a contract for one year with the newly established Turkish tclub Galatasaray  S.K.in December 2021. In the second half of the 2021-22 Turkish SWomen's Super League season, she transferred to Kireçburnu Spor. The next season, she joined Adana İdman Yurdu.

References 

1992 births
Living people
Cameroonian women's footballers
Women's association football forwards
Cameroon women's international footballers
Cameroonian expatriate women's footballers
Canon Yaoundé players
Cameroonian expatriate sportspeople in Belarus
Expatriate women's footballers in Belarus
FC Minsk (women) players
Cameroonian expatriate sportspeople in Turkey
Expatriate women's footballers in Turkey
Turkish Women's Football Super League players
Galatasaray S.K. women's football players
Kireçburnu Spor players
Adana İdmanyurduspor players